Postl is a surname. Notable people with the surname include:

Carl Postl (1793–1864), Austrian-American writer and journalist, more commonly known by pen name, Charles Sealsfield
Dylan Postl (born 1986), American wrestler more commonly known by ring name, Hornswoggle
Kurt Postl (born 1937), Austrian cyclist